Vitis xunyangensis is an Old World species of wild grape native to temperate China (Shaanxi province).

References

xunyangensis
Plants described in 1995
Flora of China